Diana and Callisto is an oil on canvas painting attributed to J. M. W. Turner, painted c. 1796. It is loosely based in an engraving of the Welsh artist Richard Wilson. It is held at the Tate Gallery, in London.

References

1790s paintings
Paintings by J. M. W. Turner
Paintings depicting Diana (mythology)
Collection of the Tate galleries